Novello Novelli (2 March 1930 – 10 January 2018) was an Italian character actor.

Life and career
Born in Poggibonsi, province of Siena, as Novellantonio Novelli, a former footballer and surveyor, Novelli initially was the manager of the cabaret group "I Giancattivi" consisting of Francesco Nuti, Athina Cenci and Alessandro Benvenuti.

In 1981, he made his acting debut in the Giancattivi's film West of Paperino, then, after the group disbanded, Novelli remained associated to Nuti, appearing in almost all his films.

He also worked with Benvenuti, being critically appreciated for his performances in Welcome to Home Gori and its sequel, Return to Home Gori.

Death
Novelli died in Poggibonsi on 10 January 2018, aged 87.

Partial filmography

West of Paperino (1981) - Francesco's father
What a Ghostly Silence There Is Tonight (1982) - Chiaramonti
The Pool Hustlers (1983) - Merlo
Son contento (1983) - 'Kursaal' director
Casablanca, Casablanca (1985) - Il 'merlo'
All the Fault of Paradise (1985) - Oste
Stregati (1986) - Novello
Noi uomini duri (1987) - Berno Berni Sr
Maramao (1987) - The lone sailor
Delitti e profumi (1988) - The ventriloquist
Caruso Pascoski, Son of a Pole (1988) - The police chief
Piccole stelle (1988)
Musica per vecchi animali (1989) - Pittore del Metro
Willy Signori e vengo da lontano (1989) - Il cadavere
Welcome to Home Gori (1990) - Annibale
The Party's Over (1991) - Corpo
Allullo drom (1992) - Giuseppe
Amami (1993) - Tullio Venturini
Bonus malus (1993) - Signor Cecchi
Cain vs. Cain (1993) - Aureliano Casamei
Miracolo italiano (1994) - Nonno di Saverio
OcchioPinocchio (1994) - Segugio
Dear Goddamned Friends (1994) - Zingaro
Noce di cocco (1995)
Albergo Roma (1996)
Return to Home Gori (1996) - Annibale
Gli inaffidabili (1997) - Cinzia's father
Mr. Fifteen Balls (1998) - Pool master
I volontari (1998) - Alfonso
Io amo Andrea (2000) - Il taxista
Un altr'anno e poi cresco (2001) - The professor
My Life with Stars and Stripes (2003) - Lando's father
La mia squadra del cuore (2003)
Via Varsavia (2006)
Sedotta e bidonata (2007)
Cenci in Cina (2009) - Forasassi
Ridere fino a volare (2012)
Una vita in gioco (2012) - Vito's grandfather
Sarebbe stato facile (2013)
Uscio e bottega (2014) - Himself (final film role)

References

External links 

1930 births
2018 deaths
People from Poggibonsi
Italian male stage actors
Italian male film actors
Italian male television actors